Jagannath Saraka (Odia: ଜଗନ୍ନାଥ ସାରକା, born 10 June 1973) is a politician from Odisha. He is a member of Biju Janata Dal (BJD) political party. He represented the Bissamcuttack Vidhan Sabha constituency in 2014 and 2019 assembly elections.

Early life 
Jagannath Saraka hails from Munda village under Jhigidi Post Office of Rayagada district. He started his career as an advocate after completing his law degree.

Political career
In 2014 assembly elections, he won from the Bissam cuttack Vidhan Sabha constituency by defeating Indian National Congress candidate Dambarudhar Ulaka by a margin of 29,186 votes. In 2019, he got elected again and became a minister of state of Scheduled Caste and Schedule Tribe development, Minorities and Backward classes welfare in the ministry of Naveen Patnaik.

References

External links 
Myneta.info

Living people
Odisha MLAs 2019–2024
Year of birth missing (living people)
Odisha MLAs 2009–2014
Odisha MLAs 2014–2019
Biju Janata Dal politicians